Elisabeth Walker-Young is a retired Canadian Paralympic swimmer, an assistant chef de mission at the 2012 Summer Paralympics and a former chef de mission for the Canadian team at the 2015 Parapan American Games. She received an Order of Canada in 2018 because of her services to the sport within the Paralympic movement at the age of 41. In 2014, Walker-Young was inducted into the Canadian Disability Hall of Fame.

Walker-Young was born without arms but has some fingers at the end of her arms.
Elizabeth and her twin sister Rebekah were born in Edmonton. They were adopted. She moved to Toronto, Ontario at a young age.  They attended  Gabrielle Roy and lived in Toronto Community Housing at Queen and Jones. Elizabeth received support from Easter Seals and was their ambassador as a child. Her sister Rebekah is a childhood leukemia survivor. Elizabeth's mom worked as a crossing guard.

References

1977 births
Living people
Swimmers from Toronto
Paralympic swimmers of Canada
Swimmers at the 1992 Summer Paralympics
Swimmers at the 1996 Summer Paralympics
Swimmers at the 2000 Summer Paralympics
Swimmers at the 2004 Summer Paralympics
Medalists at the 1996 Summer Paralympics
Medalists at the 2000 Summer Paralympics
Medalists at the 2004 Summer Paralympics
Canadian Disability Hall of Fame
Paralympic medalists in swimming
Paralympic gold medalists for Canada
Paralympic silver medalists for Canada
Paralympic bronze medalists for Canada
Canadian female medley swimmers
Medalists at the World Para Swimming Championships
Canadian female butterfly swimmers
S7-classified Paralympic swimmers
21st-century Canadian women